S.V. Uruguay is  a Bonaire football club from Rincon  that currently plays in the Bonaire League, the top level of football on Bonaire. The club was founded in 1944.

Achievements
Bonaire League
Winners (1): 1983
Runners-up (1): 1999/00
Kopa MCB
Runners-up (3): 2013, 2014, 2015/16
Source(s):

Current squad

Staff

References

Football clubs in Bonaire
Football clubs in the Netherlands Antilles
Football in Bonaire
Kralendijk
1962 establishments in the Netherlands Antilles
Association football clubs established in 1962